The Al Darah Mosque is considered one of the oldest mosques in the Bilad Al Qadeem, Manama, Bahrain. It is located east of the village in an earlier settlement and was founded by Shiite cleric Sheikh Ali Al-Baladi Al-Bahrani, buried in Abu Anbara Cemetery. The inscription marks it as built in 1741.

The mosque, like most in the village, is on foundations that rise above the since-eroded ground level.

References

Mosques in Bahrain